The 34th Simferopol Red Banner Order of Suvorov Motor Rifle Division named after S. Ordzhonikidze (Military Unit Number 45463) was a unit of the Soviet Ground Forces and later the Russian Ground Forces.

History 
It was formed by the order of the troops of the 11th Army of the Caucasian Front No. 193 of May 11, 1920 and the People's Navy Commissariat of the Azerbaijan SSR No. 48 of May 16, 1920. It was ordered to form as the "1st Consolidated Azerbaijan Workers' and Peasants Soviet Rifle Division". By a Prikaz of the NKO, No. 072 of 21 May 1936, the division became the 77th Azerbaijani Mountain Rifle Red Banner Division named for Sergei Ordzhonikidze. On 16 July 1940 it lost the Azerbaijani designation when the Red Army abolished national divisions. It was converted to the 77th Rifle Division in June 1942. It fought in Caucasus and Crimea and in the vicinity of Riga and Memel. With 51st Army of the Kurland Group (Leningrad Front) May 1945.

After a number of reorganizations (1957 onwards as 126 MRD), it became the 34th Motor Rifle Division in 1965. It spent the Cold War based at Sverdlovsk, Sverdlovsk Oblast, in the Urals Military District. The division's structure in 1989-90 included the 341st Tank Regt, 105th, 276th, and 324th MRRs, and the 239th Artillery Regiment. Sergey Surovikin became commander after 2002. It then became the 28th Motor Rifle Brigade in the city, now named Yekaterinburg, in 2009. On May 30, 2016 the brigade was transferred to Klintsy, Bryansk Oblast and reorganized into the 488th Motor Rifle Regiment of the 144th Motor Rifle Division.

Notes

Bibliography 
Michael Holm, 34th Motor Rifle Division

Motor rifle divisions of the Soviet Union
Military units and formations established in 1965
Military units and formations disestablished in 2009
Azerbaijan Soviet Socialist Republic